Dadiani Palaces History and Architectural Museum is a Georgian national museum located in Zugdidi, Samegrelo-Zemo Svaneti region, Georgia. The Dadiani Palaces History and Architecture Museum is considered to be one of the most eminent palaces in Caucasus. It is a Neo Gothic building.

History
The first exhibition, of archaeological excavations of the ancient city of Nakalakevi was prepared by Megrelian prince David Dadiani and took place in 1840. Three palaces form the modern museum complex, parts of which are also Blachernae Virgin Church and Zugdidi Botanical Garden. The Dadiani Palaces History and Architecture Museum houses some exhibits of natural cultural heritage of Georgia – Tagiloni treasure materials, Mother of God holy vesture, the icon of queen Bordokhan – mother of queen Tamar of Georgia, manuscripts from 13th – 14th centuries, miniatures, memorial relics of Dadiani dynasty, and objects connected to emperor of France Napoleon Bonaparte – brought to the palace by the husband of David Dadiani's daughter, prince Prince Charles Louise Napoléon Achille Murat (1847-1895), grandson of Napoleon's sister, Caroline Bonaparte.

The palace was fully transformed into a museum on May 1, 1921, at the initiative of Georgian ethnographer and geologist Akaki Chanturia.

Archaeological collection 
In early 1848 the prince of Samegrelo, David Dadiani, used to show his guests the archaeological and numismatic collection from Nokalakevi, an archaeological site in Samegrelo. Some of the exhibits were found by David Dadiani himself, and some were purchased by him from settlers in his domain. The most important archaeological dig by David Dadiani was the research of Nokalakevi – known as Archeopolis in Antiquity.

References

External links 
 
 

Museums established in 1840
1840 in Georgia (country)
Museums in Georgia (country)
Palaces in Georgia (country)
Buildings and structures in Samegrelo-Zemo Svaneti
Tourist attractions in Samegrelo-Zemo Svaneti
Immovable Cultural Monuments of National Significance of Georgia